Pyramids is the debut studio album by American post-rock band Pyramids. The album features a second disc of remixes, with contributions from artists such as Jesu and James Plotkin.

Track listing

Disc 1

Disc 2 - Remixes

References

2008 debut albums
Pyramids (band) albums
Hydra Head Records albums